Loïc Hennekinne (20 September 1940 – 18 April 2020) was a French government official and diplomat.

Biography
Hennekinne studied at Sciences Po and the École nationale d'administration in Paris. He was arrested in 1962 for attending a meeting of Patrie en Progrès.

He was an advisor to French Foreign Minister Roland Dumas from 1988 to 1989, then a diplomatic advisor to President François Mitterrand from 1989 to 1991.

Hennekinne served numerous French ambassadorial roles, including in Indonesia, Japan, Canada, and Italy. He also served as Inspector General and Secretary General of the Ministry of Foreign Affairs.

After the end of his public career, Hennekinne joined the Fondation Res Publica, founded by Jean-Pierre Chevènement, and was on its scientific council. He served as an advisor to Arnaud Montebourg during the 2017 French Socialist Party presidential primary on foreign policy issues.

Distinctions
Ambassadeur de France (1999)
Officer of the Ordre national du Mérite (1998)
Commander of the Legion of Honour (2007)

References

1940 births
2020 deaths
20th-century French diplomats
21st-century French diplomats
Ambassadors of France to Canada
Ambassadors of France to Indonesia
Ambassadors of France to Italy
Ambassadors of France to Japan
École nationale d'administration alumni
People from Bordeaux